The School of Social and Political Science (SSPS) at the University of Edinburgh is a unit within the College of Arts, Humanities and Social Sciences. Its constituent departments (called 'subject areas' in Edinburgh) conduct research and teaching in the following disciplines:

 Politics and International relations
 Science, Technology & Innovation Studies
 Social Anthropology
 Social Policy
 Social Work
 Sociology
 Sustainable Development

In addition to these core subjects, the school includes the Europa Institute, Centre for Security Research, Innogen Institute (a collaboration with the Open University) and the Centres of African Studies, Canadian Studies and South Asian Studies.

The School is primarily based in the Chrystal Macmillan Building on George Square, named after the suffragist and first female science graduate of the university. It is one of only two buildings at the University named after a woman.

The School employs over 400 full-time and part-time academics and almost 100 professional services staff. Its current dean is Professor of Social Work John Devaney.

The School's subject areas are consistently placed in the top 100 departments globally in academic rankings, such as the Academic Ranking of World Universities (political science – top 100, sociology – top 75), Times Higher Education World University Rankings (social sciences – no. 36), and the QS World University Rankings (political science – no. 40, social sciences – no. 51).

Academy of Government
The Academy of Government was a public policy and public administration school in SSPS from 2012 to 2018. It offered master's degrees in public policy and, from 2012, public administration. The Academy's Director was Charlie Jeffery, who was also Professor of Politics and Head of the School of Social and Political Science. In 2018 some of its activities were merged into the Edinburgh Futures Institute, and the academy ceased functioning.

Notable staff and alumni

Staff 
 Tom Burns, sociologist
 Janet Carsten  , anthropologist
 Tim Hayward, political scientist
 Michael Keating   , political scientist
 Fiona Mackay  , political scientist
 Nicola McEwen , political scientist
 Jonathan Spencer  , social anthropologist
 Joyce Tait   FSRA, scientist
 Kath Weston, social anthropologist

Alumni 

 Douglas Alexander, Scottish Labour party politician
 David Campbell Bannerman, British Conservative Party politician
 Christy Clark, former Premier of British Columbia
 Susan Deacon, former Scottish Labour party politician
 Kezia Dugdale, Scottish Labour party politician
 Edwin Feulner, American academic and founder of conservative think tank The Heritage Foundation
 Johnny Hornby, British businessman
 Michael Ingham, retired bishop and theologian in the Anglican Church of Canada
 Prakash Karat, Indian politician
 Allan Little, former BBC reporter
 Callum McCaig, Scottish National Party politician
 Sheila McKechnie, Scottish trade unionist and consumer activist
 Catherine McKinnell, British Labour party politician
 Steve Morrison, television producer and former Rector of the University of Edinburgh
 Edoardo Mapelli Mozzi, businessman and husband of Princess Beatrice
 Ian Murray, Scottish Labour party politician
 Julius Nyerere, first President of Tanzania
 Malcolm Rifkind, British Conservative party politician and Cabinet minister
 Margareta of Romania, head of the Romanian royal family
 Princess Tsuguko of Takamado, member of the Imperial House of Japan (did not graduate)

References

External links
 School of Social and Political Science, University of Edinburgh

Political science education
Schools of the University of Edinburgh
Political science in the United Kingdom
Social science institutes